() is a naval rank, of German origin, used by a number of countries. The term is derived from the low German  (comrade). Via the Dutch language, the word became a nautical term and described the assistant to a deck officer. Since the second half of the 17th century  were the lowest class of non-commissioned officers aboard a warship.

Denmark

Estonia

Germany

However, Maate is also the collective name to all junior NCO-ranks (ranks: Maat, Seekadett, and Obermaat) in the modern day's German Navy.

In navy context NCOs of this rank were formally addressed as Herr/ Frau Maat also informally / short Maat. The sequence of ranks (top-down approach) in that particular group is as follows:
Unteroffizier ohne Portepee
OR-5: Obermaat / (Heer/ Luftwaffe) Stabsunteroffizier
OR-5: Seekadett / Fahnenjunker 
OR-5: Maat / Unteroffizier

History
In the Prussian Navy and the Kaiserliche Marine Maate were Unteroffiziere ohne Portepee. According to their specialization, Maate would be known as e.g. Steuermannsmaat (Coxswain's Mate), Feuerwerksmaat (Ordnance Mate), Bootsmannsmaat (Boatswain's Mate) or Maschinistenmaat (Machinist's Mate).
Maate were recruited among conscripts who volunteered to serve for a minimum of six years. After approximately four years they could expect to become Maat. Re-enlistment was common but in most specialities the career options would end with achieving the rank of Obermaat; only after 18 years in service was a promotion as supernumary Vizefeldwebel possible, and only if there was a billet open. The 1914/15 naval budget included 7857 billets for Maate and 5237 for Obermaate.

Kriegsmarine

Poland

See also
 Ranks of the German Bundeswehr
 Rank insignia of the German Bundeswehr
 Ranks and insignia of NATO navies enlisted

References

Naval ranks of Germany